Glenesteroceras, which is of questionable validity, is based on a single specimen from the Lower Ordovician of New York state, described by Rousseau Flower, 1957.

Glenestoceras is described as being a weakly annulate orthocone with a circular cross section and large central siphuncle with slightly divergent necks, thick connecting rings, and expanded segments. Description is based on an incomplete immature phragmocone with a 5mm cross section.

References

 Walter A Sweet, 1964. Nautiloidea - Orthocerida, Treatise on Invertebrate Paleontology, Part K, incl Nautiloidea. Geological Society of America and University of Kansas Press.

Prehistoric nautiloid genera